The women's duet competition of the synchronized swimming events at the 2011 Pan American Games in Guadalajara were held from October 18 to October 20, at the Scotiabank Aquatics Center. The defending Pan American Champion is the duet from the United States.

All ten duets competed in both rounds of the competition. The first round consisted of a technical, while the second round was a free routine.  The winner was the duet with the highest combined score. The technical routine consisted of ten required elements, which had to be completed in order and within a time of between 2 minutes 5 seconds and 2 minutes 35 seconds. The free routine had no restrictions other than time; this routine had to last between 3 minutes 15 seconds and 3 minutes 45 seconds.

With the win the Canadian Duet of Élise Marcotte and Marie-Pier Boudreau Gagnon qualify to compete in the 2012 Summer Olympics in London, Great Britain.

Schedule
All times are Central Standard time (UTC-6).

Results

References

Synchronized swimming at the 2011 Pan American Games